The 1990 Pacific Cup was the fifth edition of the Pacific Cup, a rugby league tournament held between Pacific teams. The tournament was hosted by Tonga and eventually won by Western Samoa, who defeated New Zealand Māori 26–18 in the final, a replay of the 1988 final.

Squads
The Australian Aborigines squad included Ricky Walford, Graham Lyons and Ron Gibbs.
The New Zealand Māori squad included Dean Clark, Sean Hoppe, Jason Mackie and captain Kelly Shelford. 
The Friendly Islands side was made up mainly of local Tongan players.
Western Samoa included Se'e Solomona, Tony Tatupu. Vae Afoa and Tony Tuimavave.

Results

Group A

Group B

Finals

Semi-finals

Final

References

External links
International Competitions 1990 The Vault

Pacific Cup
Pacific Cup
Rugby league in Tonga
1990 in Tongan sport
Pacific Cup